Honobia Creek Wildlife Management Area is a protected area of privately owned land located in Pushmataha, Le Flore, and McCurtain Counties, Oklahoma, totaling , and managed by the Oklahoma Department of Wildlife Conservation (ODWC).

Organization

Three private forest investment companies, the Hancock Natural Resource Group (HNRG), Rayonier Forest Resources, and Molpus Timberlands Management, entered into agreements with the Oklahoma Department of Wildlife Conservation (ODWC) in 2010 to manage the states first privately owned WMA. The property is run under a land access fee permit system.

Location
Located in the southeast corner of Oklahoma twenty-one miles of the upper course of the Little River flows through the WMA. The  Three Rivers WMA shares  of border on the east side.

See also
List of Oklahoma Wildlife Management Areas

References

Protected areas of Oklahoma

Protected areas of Le Flore County, Oklahoma
Protected areas of McCurtain County, Oklahoma
Protected areas of Pushmataha County, Oklahoma